Macpac may refer to:
 Macpac, a company producing outdoors equipment
 Nitrofurantoin, by the trade name Macpac